Janina Déia Chagas da Conceição (born October 25, 1972 in Rio de Janeiro) is a volleyball player who competed for Brazil in the 1996 and 2000 Olympic Games. She won the gold medal with the Women's National Team at the 1999 Pan American Games. She participated at the 1999 FIVB Volleyball Women's World Cup.

References

External links 

  UOL profile
 Janina Conceicao, Getty images

1972 births
Living people
Volleyball players at the 2000 Summer Olympics
Olympic volleyball players of Brazil
Olympic bronze medalists for Brazil
Volleyball players from Rio de Janeiro (city)
Brazilian women's volleyball players
Olympic medalists in volleyball
Medalists at the 2000 Summer Olympics
Pan American Games gold medalists for Brazil
Pan American Games medalists in volleyball
Volleyball players at the 1999 Pan American Games
Medalists at the 1999 Pan American Games